The 2018 Oceania Rugby Under 20s, was the fourth edition of the Oceania Rugby Junior Championship.  played in the tournament for the first time, replacing  from the previous year and joining  ,  and hosts  at Bond University on the Gold Coast.

The Oceania Championship was played over three rounds in nine days, with New Zealand defeating Australia by 43–28 in the last match of the round-robin tournament to take the title.

Teams
The teams for the 2018 Oceania Rugby Under 20 tournaments were:

Championship

Trophy

Championship

Standings
{| class="wikitable" style="width:80%; text-align:center"
|-
! colspan="12" | 2018 Oceania Rugby Under 20 Championship
|- 
! style="width:12.5em;" | Team
! style="width:1.5em;" | 
! style="width:1.5em;" | 
! style="width:1.5em;" | 
! style="width:1.5em;" | 
! style="width:2.0em;" | 
! style="width:2.0em;" |  
! style="width:2.0em;" | 
! style="width:1.5em;" | 
! style="width:1.5em;" | 
! style="width:1.5em;" | 

|- bgcolor=#cfc
|align=left|
| 3|| 3||0 ||0 ||195||43 ||+152 || 3 || 0 || 15
|-
|align=left|
| 3|| 2||0 ||1 ||170||55 ||+115 || 3 || 0 || 11
|-
|align=left|
| 3|| 1||0 ||2 ||74||106 ||−32 || 1 || 0 || 5
|-
|align=left|
| 3|| 0||0 ||3 ||7 ||242||−235 || 0 || 0 || 0
|-
|colspan="15" style="vertical-align:bottom; font-size:85%;"|Updated: 5 May 2018
Source: rugbyarchive.net
|}
{| class="wikitable collapsible collapsed" style="text-align:center; line-height:100%; font-size:100%; width:50%;"
|-
! colspan="4" style="border:0px" |Competition rules
|-
| colspan="4" | Points breakdown:4 points for a win2 points for a draw1 bonus point for a loss by seven points or less 1 bonus point for scoring four or more tries in a matchClassification:Teams standings are calculated as follows:Most log points accumulated from all matchesMost log points accumulated in matches between tied teamsHighest difference between points scored for and against accumulated from all matchesMost points scored accumulated from all matches
|}

Round 1

Round 2

Round 3

Trophy
The Oceania Trophy was played at Lotopa, near Apia in Samoa, as a two-match series between Samoa and Tonga.

Standings
Final competition table:
{| class="wikitable" style="text-align:center;"
|-
!width=25 |#
!width=175 |Team
!width=25 abbr="Played" |Pld
!width=25 abbr="Won" |W
!width=25 abbr="Drawn" |D
!width=25 abbr="Lost" |L
!width=32 abbr="Points for" |PF
!width=32 abbr="Points against" |PA
!width=32 abbr="Points difference" |PD
!width=25 abbr="Points" |Pts
|- bgcolor=ccffcc
|- align=center |- style="background: #CCFFCC;"
|1||align=left| 
| 2||2||0||0||43||32||+ 11||8
|- align=center
|2||align=left| 
| 2||0||0||2||32||43||- 11||2
|-
|colspan="10"|Updated: 8 December 2018
Source: Oceania Rugby
|}
{| class="wikitable collapsible collapsed" style="text-align:center; line-height:100%; font-size:100%; width:50%;"
|-
! colspan="4" style="border:0px" |Competition rules
|-
| colspan="4" | 
|}

Results

See also
2018 World Rugby Under 20 Championship
2018 World Rugby Under 20 Trophy

References

External links
Oceania Rugby website 

Oceania Under 20 Rugby Championship
Rugby union competitions in Queensland
Sport on the Gold Coast, Queensland
Oceania Under 20
Oceania Under 20 Rugby Championship
Oceania Under 20 Rugby Championship
Oceania Under 20 Rugby Championship
Oceania Under 20 Rugby Championship
Oceania Under 20 Rugby Championship